Symbolic Analysis Program for Windows (SAPWIN) is a proprietary symbolic circuit simulator written in C++ for the Microsoft Windows operating systems Vista, 7.0 and 8.1. Unlike more common numerical circuit simulators (such as Simulation Program with Integrated Circuit Emphasis (SPICE)), SAPWIN can generate analytical Laplace domain expressions for arbitrary network functions of linear analog circuits. The SAPWIN package also includes tools for schematic capture and graphic post-processing.

SAPWIN is available free from its homepage at the University of Florence website.

SapecNG
Symbolic Analysis Program for Electric Circuits - Next Generation (SapecNG) is the open-source software relative of SAPWIN, written in Boost C++ libraries and designed to be cross-platform. QSapecNG is a Qt-based graphical user interface (GUI) and schematic capture program for SAPEC-NG.

See also

 Comparison of EDA software
 List of free electronics circuit simulators
 Symbolic Circuit Analysis

References

External links 
 
 SAPWIN - A Symbolic Simulator as a Support in Electrical Engineering Education
 

Electronic circuit simulators
Free software programmed in C++
Free electronic design automation software
Electronic design automation software for Linux
University of Florence
Windows-only free software
Engineering software that uses Qt